Arghus Soares Bordignon (born 19 January 1988), known as simply Arghus, is a Brazilian football centre-back.

Club career
After a series of short spells with various Brazilian and European clubs, Arghus signed a three-year contract with Slovenian club Maribor in 2011. Between December 2011 and May 2012, Arghus was sidelined due to injury and returned on the football pitch in late May 2012 as a substitute in a match against Mura 05, scoring a goal just several minutes later.

On 4 August 2016, he signed for Excelsior on a one-year loan deal.

On 26 January 2018, Panetolikos officially announced their deal with Arghus, who was released from Braga for an undisclosed fee. He signed a contract until the summer of 2019. His first goal came on 25 February 2019, in a 1–0 home win against PAS Giannina. Two weeks later, he opened the score in a 5–0 home win against Panionios.

Honours
Maribor
Slovenian PrvaLiga (4): 2011–12, 2012–13, 2013–14, 2014–15
Slovenian Cup (2): 2011–12, 2012–13
Slovenian Supercup (3): 2012, 2013, 2014

Braga
Taça de Portugal (1): 2015–16

Personal life
Unlike many Brazilian footballers, who lived and played football on the streets, Arghus had a better life as a child, living in a small and quiet town. His mother was a Portuguese language professor and his father a policeman. He also has a younger brother who is involved in football. Arghus is multilingual, speaking three languages fluently: Portuguese, Spanish and Italian. He is married to a long-time girlfriend and childhood friend, Amanda. Arghus holds a dual citizenship of Brazil and Italy.

References

External sources
 
 Arghus at PrvaLiga 

1988 births
People from Alegrete
Living people
Brazilian footballers
Association football defenders
Grêmio Esportivo Brasil players
NK Maribor players
S.C. Braga players
S.C. Braga B players
Excelsior Rotterdam players
Panetolikos F.C. players
Associação Académica de Coimbra – O.A.F. players
Campeonato Brasileiro Série D players
Slovenian PrvaLiga players
Primeira Liga players
Eredivisie players
Liga Portugal 2 players
Super League Greece players
Brazilian expatriate footballers
Expatriate footballers in Italy
Brazilian expatriate sportspeople in Italy
Expatriate footballers in Slovenia
Brazilian expatriate sportspeople in Slovenia
Expatriate footballers in Portugal
Brazilian expatriate sportspeople in Portugal
Expatriate footballers in the Netherlands
Brazilian expatriate sportspeople in the Netherlands
Expatriate footballers in Greece
Brazilian expatriate sportspeople in Greece
Sportspeople from Rio Grande do Sul